Don't Weigh Down the Light is the fourth studio album by folk singer Meg Baird, released in 2015 on the Wichita label in the UK and the Drag City label in the US.

Reception
Don't Weigh Down the Light received positive reviews from critics. On Metacritic, the album holds a score of 79/100 based on 18 reviews, indicating "generally favorable reviews."

Track listing
 "Counterfeiters"
 "I Don't Mind"
 "Mosquito Hawks"
 "Back To You"
 "Past Houses"
 "Leaving Song"
 "Stars Unwinding"
 "Good Directions"
 "Don't Weigh Down The Light"
 "Even The Walls Don't Want You To Go"
 "Past Houses (Reprise)"

References

External links
 

2015 albums
Meg Baird albums
Drag City (record label) albums